Colleen A. Kraft (born Colleen Anne McGrath, March 4, 1960) is an American pediatrician specialized in community pediatrics, child advocacy, and healthcare financing.

Early life and education 
In 1965, Kraft graduated in the first class of the Head Start program. She completed a bachelor's degree at Virginia Tech. Kraft earned a M.D. at the VCU School of Medicine. She completed a pediatric residency at VCU. She completed a M.B.A. at the University of Cincinnati.

Career 
Kraft worked in community pediatrics in Richmond, Virginia. In 2009, became the founding pediatric program director at the Virginia Tech Carilion School of Medicine and Research Institute. From 2014 to 2017, she was head of the pediatric accountable care program at Cincinnati Children's Hospital Medical Center. From 2016 to 2017, Kraft served as the medical director of a health network and pediatric health initiative at the Children's Hospital Medical Center.

Kraft was president of the Virginia chapter of the American Academy of Pediatrics (AAP) from 2006 to 2008. She was president of the AAP for a one-year term starting January 1, 2018. As president, she advocated for humane treatment of children at the Mexico–United States border and elaborated on the harm of the zero tolerance of the Trump administration family separation policy.

Research 
Kraft was principal investigator for the Children's Hospital Association's Health Care Innovation Award. Her clinical focuses includes community pediatrics, child advocacy, health care financing, and pediatric education. Her research interests include early brain and childhood development and children with special healthcare needs.

Awards and honors 
Kraft is a fellow of the American Academy of Pediatrics.

Personal life 
In April 1981 in Montgomery County, Virginia, she married Kenneth Allen Kraft (born 1956). They became the parents of three children.

Selected works 

  quick reference guide pdf's at aap.org; description of 2018 pbk 2nd edition at aap.org

References

External links

1960 births
Living people
American pediatricians
Women pediatricians
20th-century American women physicians
20th-century American physicians
21st-century American women physicians
21st-century American physicians
American medical researchers
Women medical researchers
Virginia Tech alumni
Medical College of Virginia alumni
University of Cincinnati alumni
University of Cincinnati faculty
Children's rights activists
American human rights activists
Women human rights activists
Physicians from Virginia
American women academics